Donut Wheel is a doughnut shop, established 1958, and is a landmark in Livermore, California.  The Donut Wheel used to be open 24 hours.  The Donut Wheel is located at the intersection of First Street and L Street. It was the location that the City of Livermore divided the city into four quadrants, and was used by the Fire Department, Police Department and Public Works.

The Donut Wheel was originally started in 1962 by Jack and Jean Weil. It was originally named Jack's Donut Wheel and named after the owner, Jack Weil. Jack and his brothers, Dave and Bill, got their start in baking at a young age and worked for several years at Stemple's Bakery in San Francisco, Ca. His brother Bill opened a shop in Cupertino and then Jack and Jean moved to Campbell and Jack went to work for Bill.  Jack and Jean bought in to their corporation and then opened the Livermore Donut Wheel.
The Donut Wheel got its name from a suggestion from a man that worked with Jack at Stemple's. He said that he should call it the Donut Wheel because that is how people pronounced his name, “wheel” instead of Weil (pronounced, "while"). 
They were open 7 days a week, and only closed on Sunday afternoons. They had 2 people working for them in the beginning. Jean Weil's sister Beverly Syester and Jerry Musselman, and of course Jack and Jean's three daughters, Marita, Jackie, and Kathy were there to help out after school and on the weekends.
Jack primarily worked throughout the night making the donuts and Jean would pretty much run the rest of the business during the day.

Jack and Jean sold Jack's Donut Wheel in 1972 and bought a Donut Shop in San Jose, CA. for several years, and then moved to Sacramento, CA. and bought Sweet Things, a donut shop & lunch counter. They were in San Jose for about twenty years before selling and landing in Sacramento, CA, where they retired in 1993.

The Livermore Donut Wheel has changed hands a few times over the years, but has kept the name Donut Wheel. It is the one of the few things that has stayed unchanged as Livermore has grown and changed over the years.

History
The building was built in 1941, as a Purity grocery store. It is an example of Googie architecture.

For generations The Donut Wheel has been a place where people have met after the town has closed down or as the nearby bars close.

The Donut Wheel pioneered the secret menu that was copied and made famous by establishments like In-N-Out and Jamba Juice. In the late 1980s between the hours of 3 am and 5 am customers could bring their own fillings to fill their donuts. This was short-lived after a new baker was hired to replace the indulgent one.

The only day The Donut Wheel has closed down was December 9, 1980, to mourn the murder of John Lennon.

References

Googie architecture in California
1958 establishments in California
Livermore, California
Doughnut shops
Landmarks in the San Francisco Bay Area
Architecture in the San Francisco Bay Area
1941 establishments in California
Commercial buildings completed in 1941